The women's pole vault event at the 2009 European Athletics Indoor Championships was held on 6 and 7 March.

Medalists

Results

Qualification
Qualification: Qualification Performance 4.45 (Q) or at least 8 best performers advanced to the final.

Final

References
 Results

Pole vault at the European Athletics Indoor Championships
2009 European Athletics Indoor Championships
2009 in women's athletics